"Empedocles" is the seventeenth episode of the eighth season of the American science fiction television series The X-Files. The episode was written by Greg Walker and directed by Barry K. Thomas. "Empedocles" is a "Monster-of-the-Week" story, unconnected to the series' wider mythology. The episode received a Nielsen rating of 7.3 and was viewed by 7.46 million households and over 12.46 million viewers. Overall, the episode received mixed reviews from critics.

The show centers on FBI special agents Fox Mulder (David Duchovny), Dana Scully (Gillian Anderson) and John Doggett (Robert Patrick), who work on cases linked to the paranormal, called X-Files. In this episode, Monica Reyes (Annabeth Gish) enlists Mulder's help investigating a killer's connection to the unsolved murder of Doggett's son, but Mulder soon finds himself clashing with Doggett.

"Empedocles" was named after the famed Greek pre-Socratic philosopher of the same name. The episode marked the return of Special Agent Monica Reyes, who was first introduced in the earlier season eight episode "This is Not Happening". Reyes would later become Doggett's partner, in the show's ninth season. The episode included an elaborate special effects sequence wherein actor Jay Underwood rips off his face to reveal fire underneath his skin, which was created via green screen technology.

Plot
In New Orleans, mild-mannered white-collar worker Jeb Larold Dukes (Jay Underwood) is fired from his job. After he leaves the office, Jeb witnesses a car chase which ends in a fiery crash. A burning figure that only Jeb can see emerges from the wreck and seems to merge with him. Jeb, now possessed by the being, returns to his office to massacre his boss and co-workers.

Monica Reyes (Annabeth Gish) arrives at the crime scene and meets NOPD detective Franklin Potter, who has called her in out of his belief that the murders are related to satanism. Reyes merely answers the detective that it was not devil worship, and that the killer probably was under stress. As she is leaving, she witnesses one of the bodies carbonize into a charred corpse in front of her, only to have it revert to normal.

Fox Mulder (David Duchovny) takes a pregnant Dana Scully (Gillian Anderson) to the hospital when she doubles over in pain. There, Reyes phones him to ask about the case, but Mulder cedes to the authority of John Doggett (Robert Patrick), who is formally running the X-Files. However, Reyes says she can't call Doggett since it is about him. Meanwhile, Jeb is in a hotel room in Georgia trying to shoot himself in the head. Suddenly, he notices something wrong with his face; he claws at his face, peeling away the skin to reveal burning embers underneath.

Mulder and Reyes meet in an FBI records room, where she divulges that she was one of the agents called in to investigate the murder of Doggett's son Luke years previously. They never found the killer, and when they discovered Luke's body, both Reyes and Doggett saw it transform into ashes instantly, something Doggett has spent the last few years convincing himself he did not see. Reyes believes it was a psychic clue, and now with the other crime scene, she has seen it again.

Doggett soon attacks Mulder for looking into his son's case, but Reyes explains why they are investigating. She reveals that Bob Harvey, a suspect in Luke's murder, died in the car crash in New Orleans. Reyes stresses her vision's importance, but Doggett dismisses it. Reyes then visits Jeb's sister, Katha, and learns he did not know Bob Harvey. While Reyes is there, Katha receives a call from Jeb, but tells him to call later. As Jeb leaves the phone booth, he kills a female motorist. Meanwhile, Doggett learns from Scully that she has suffered a placental abruption. He asks her what made her start to believe in the paranormal. She says she realized she was "afraid to believe." Scully later tells Mulder to keep trying to help Doggett.

As Doggett approaches the body of Jeb's latest victim, he has a flashback of when he found Luke's body. Doggett storms off, but Reyes refuses to let it go, finally revealing her theory: she believes that the boy's murder was part of a "thread of evil," an interconnected series of terrible events. Meanwhile, Katha returns home with her daughter and finds Jeb there. He insists that it wasn't him who committed the murder, and pleads to his sister for help. Katha calls the agents and tries to separate her daughter from Jeb, but he realizes what she is planning and uses his niece as a hostage. Before Jeb can shoot Doggett, Reyes incapacitates him with a round to the throat.

Doggett finally embraces the memory of his vision. Mulder tells him that when he worked in violent crimes and saw the horrible things people did, he began to think of evil like a disease that infected people. Some lack immunity to this disease of evil because of some tragedy in their lives. Jeb dies while Reyes and Katha are in the room. After the doctors leave, Katha's eyes glow, much like Jeb's. She hits Reyes over the head with an oxygen tank and takes her gun. Before she can execute Reyes for killing her brother, Doggett appears and wrestles her to the ground.
At the end Dogget looks in on Katha seeming to be drugged laying in a hospital bed.

Production

Writing
The episode was written by Greg Walker and directed by Barry K. Thomas, marking his directoral debut. The episode takes its title from the famed Greek pre-Socratic philosopher of the same name. Empedocles believed that out of the four classic elements—earth, wind, fire, and water—fire was the most superior. As such, Empedocles is often associated with fire. According to legend recorded by Diogenes Laërtius, in order to ascend to godhood, Empedocles threw himself into a volcano in Mount Etna.

The episode marked the return of Special Agent Monica Reyes, who was first introduced in the earlier season eight episode "This is Not Happening". Although Reyes would later become Doggett's partner, the series attempted to differentiate the Doggett/Reyes relationship from the Mulder/Scully relationship. Robert Patrick later noted, "We're not going to try to duplicate [the Mulder and Scully relationship], we're not going to try to regenerate the magic chemistry." However, he later did say "that Gillian and I had our own chemistry that was unique unto itself, and likewise with the addition of Annabeth. It was different."

Special effects
In order to create the "Lava Face" effect, actor Jay Underwood's face was painted green. A mask with pre-cut slits was then placed over the skin. Underwood then tore the mask off of his own face, revealing streaks of the green coloring. A matte of the scene was then cut and various fire effects were placed into Underwood's face via green screen technology. In order to make the "cracks" appear, digital technology was created to "smooth over" the skin and then slowly reveal the pre-cut slits. Producer Paul Rabwin later joked that Underwood "had fire for brains".

Reception
"Empedocles" first aired on Fox on April 22, 2001. The episode earned a Nielsen household rating of 7.3, meaning that it was seen by 7.3% of the nation's estimated households. The episode was viewed by 7.46 million households and over 12.46 million viewers. The episode ranked as the 40th most-watched episode for the week ending April 22. The episode subsequently aired in the United Kingdom on the BBC Two on July 28, 2002. Fox promoted the episode with the tagline "The murder of Doggett's son is about to become an X-file."

Critical reception to the episode was mostly mixed. Robert Shearman and Lars Pearson, in their book Wanting to Believe: A Critical Guide to The X-Files, Millennium & The Lone Gunmen, rated the episode three-and-a-half stars out of five. The two noted that the "X-File in itself is an interesting concept, but left frustratingly vague." Shearman and Pearson, however, did positively write that the episode is "a character study which gives its new leads some background and depth and, better yet, somewhere new to develop." VanDerWerff later awarded the episode an "C+" and wrote that "there are a lot of things to like in "Empedocles," but the central conceit is just too stupid for the episode as a whole to work." While she enjoyed the "way that [the episode] features all four FBI agents in the same episode", she was critical of both the plot and the Mulder and Scully dynamic, noting that it fell flat.

Paula Vitaris from Cinefantastique gave the episode a negative review and awarded it one-and-a-half stars out of four. She criticized several of the plot points in the episode, most notably how a "big-city" New Orleans detective could mistake Marilyn Manson CDs as signs of blatant satanic imagery. Vitaris further criticized the "sidelined" behavior of Scully and the "shoehorned" characterization of Reyes. Tom Kessenich, in his book Examinations, wrote a largely negative review of the episode. He criticized the downsized role Mulder and Scully played in the episode, noting that they had been "reduced to mere footnotes". Furthermore, Kessenich reasoned that, by trying to "prep for [a] future" of just Doggett and Reyes and "[connect] to the past" with Mulder and Scully, the episode ultimately "served to remind us how Doggett and Reyes pale in comparison to the magic of Mulder and Scully."

Not all reviews were negative. Television Without Pity writer Jessica Morgan rated the episode a B−. Sarah Stegall awarded the episode five stars out of five and noted "Being dead has done wonders for Fox Mulder." Stegall concluded that the episode "is one of the best episodes of the new era. Mulder and Scully get one last chance to remind us why we will miss them, and Doggett and Reyes get a chance to earn their stripes. [...] If this is the season where the torch gets passed, it's good to see that it's got one last flare in it."

Notes

Footnotes

Bibliography

External links 

2001 American television episodes
Television episodes set in Georgia (U.S. state)
Television episodes set in Maryland
Television episodes set in New Orleans
Television episodes about Satanism
Television episodes set in South Carolina
The X-Files (season 8) episodes